The women's 4 × 400 metres relay event at the 1994 Commonwealth Games was held on 28 August at the Centennial Stadium in Victoria, British Columbia.

Results

The Australian team originally won in 3:26.84 but were later disqualified for obstructing the Nigerians on the final leg.

References

Relay
1994
1994 in women's athletics